South Ormsby, sometimes called South Ormesby, is a village in the East Lindsey district of Lincolnshire, England. With the nearby hamlet of Ketsby, it forms the civil parish of South Ormesby with Ketsby. The population is included in the civil parish of Brinkhill.

The 15th-century church of St Leonard's is approached by a short climb up a path next to the old school house.

Ormsby Hall, built by James Paine in 1752, stands in a wooded parkland complete with lake.

The village has a public house, the Massingberd Arms, and a motor repair garage.

The Greenwich Prime Meridian line passes through the village.

External links 

 East Lindsey District Council website

Villages in Lincolnshire
East Lindsey District